Scioto Grove Metro Park is a metropolitan park in Grove City, Ohio, owned and operated by Columbus and Franklin County Metro Parks. Scioto Grove features eight trails and five backpacking campsites. It has picnic shelters, an event space, traditional and 3-D archery ranges, and a disc golf course.

The park was established in 2016.

References

External links

 

Parks in Ohio
2016 establishments in Ohio
Parks established in 2016
Protected areas of Franklin County, Ohio